The full lineup of Guarenas / Guatire metro stations, which serve the subway and suburban light rail systems of Caracas, Venezuela, is as follows (as of 2012):

Subway Line
 Parque del Este
 Montecristo
 Boleita
 Horizonte
 La Urbina Sur
 La Urbina Norte

Light Train Line
 La Urbina Norte
 Caucaugüita
 Tamarindo
 Guarenas I
 Guarenas II
 Guatire I
 Guatire II

See also
List of Caracas Metro stations

Guarenas Guatire
Metro, Guarenas Guatire
Rapid transit in Venezuela
Guarenas